Saciperere is a monotypic genus of South American cellar spiders containing the single species, Saciperere catuaba. It was first described by B. A. Huber and L. S. Carvalho in 2019, and it has only been found in Brazil.

See also
 List of Pholcidae species

References

Monotypic Pholcidae genera
Spiders of Brazil